Damien Sayre Chazelle (born January 19, 1985) is a French-American film director, screenwriter and producer. He is known for directing the films Whiplash (2014), La La Land (2016), First Man (2018) and Babylon (2022).

For Whiplash, he was nominated for the Academy Award for Best Adapted Screenplay. His biggest commercial success came with La La Land, which was nominated for 14 Academy Awards, winning six including Best Director, making him the youngest person to win the award at age 32. He made his television debut directing the Netflix limited series The Eddy (2020).

Early life and education 
Chazelle was born in Providence, Rhode Island to a Catholic family. His French-American father, Bernard Chazelle, is the Eugene Higgins Professor of computer science at Princeton University, and was born in Clamart, France. His mother, Celia, is from an English-Canadian family based in Calgary, Alberta, and teaches medieval history at The College of New Jersey.

Chazelle was raised in Princeton, New Jersey, where, although a Catholic, he attended a Hebrew school for four years due to his parents' dissatisfaction with his religious education at a church Sunday school. 

Chazelle has a sister, Anna, who is an actress. Their English-born maternal grandfather, John Martin, is the son of stage actress Eileen Earle.

Filmmaking was Chazelle's first love, but he subsequently wanted to be a musician and struggled to make it as a jazz drummer at Princeton High School. He has said that he had an intense music teacher in the Princeton High School Studio Band, who was the inspiration for the character of Terence Fletcher (J.K. Simmons) in Chazelle's breakout film Whiplash. Unlike the film's protagonist Andrew Neiman (Miles Teller), Chazelle stated that he knew instinctively that he never had the talent to be a great drummer and after high school, pursued filmmaking again. He studied filmmaking in the Visual and Environmental Studies department at Harvard University and graduated in 2007.

At Harvard, he lived in Currier House as roommates with composer and frequent collaborator Justin Hurwitz. The two were among the original members of the indie-pop group Chester French, formed during their freshman year.

Career

Early work and career beginnings 
Chazelle wrote and directed his debut feature, Guy and Madeline on a Park Bench, as part of his senior thesis project with classmate Justin Hurwitz at Harvard. The film premiered at Tribeca Film Festival in 2009 and received various awards on the festival circuit, before being picked up by Variance Films for limited release and opening to critical acclaim.

After graduation, Chazelle moved to Los Angeles with the ultimate goal of attracting interest to produce his musical La La Land. Chazelle worked as a "writer-for-hire" in Hollywood; among his writing credits are The Last Exorcism Part II (2013) and Grand Piano (2013). He was also brought in by J. J. Abrams' Bad Robot Productions to re-write a draft of 10 Cloverfield Lane (2016) with the intention of also directing, but Chazelle ultimately chose to direct Whiplash instead.

Breakthrough and success 
Chazelle initially described Whiplash as a writing reaction to being stuck on another script: "I just thought, that's not working, let me put it away and write this thing about being a jazz drummer in high school." He stated he initially did not want to show the script around, as it felt too personal, and "I put it in a drawer". Although nobody was initially interested in producing the film, his script was featured on Black List in 2012 as one of the best unmade films of that year. The project was eventually picked up by Right of Way Films and Blumhouse Productions, who suggested that Chazelle turn a portion of his script into a short film as proof-of-concept. The 18-minute short was accepted at the 2013 Sundance Film Festival, where it was well-received; financing was then raised for the feature film, and, in 2014, it was released to an overwhelmingly positive critical reaction. Whiplash received numerous awards on the festival circuit and earned five Oscar nominations, including Best Adapted Screenplay for Chazelle, winning three. 
Thanks to the success of Whiplash, Chazelle was able to attract financiers for his musical La La Land. The film opened the Venice International Film Festival on August 31, 2016, and began a limited release in the United States on December 9, 2016, with a wider release on December 16, 2016. It has received rave reviews from critics and numerous awards. Chazelle was particularly praised for his work on the film and received several top honors, including a Golden Globe and an Academy Award for Best Director, making Chazelle the youngest director to win each award, at age 32. A stage musical adaptation of the film is currently in development, with Ayad Akhtar and Matthew Decker adapting from Chazelle's script and Hurwitz, Benj Pasek and Justin Paul all returning as songwriters after winning Golden Globes and Academy Awards for their score and original song "City of Stars." Marc Platt, another collaborator of Chazelle who produced this film and Babylon, will also return to produce the stage adaptation.

Chazelle next reunited with Gosling on the film First Man (2018), for Universal Pictures. With a screenplay by Josh Singer, the biopic is based on author James R. Hansen's First Man: The Life of Neil A. Armstrong, written about the astronaut. The film received positive reviews, with Owen Gleiberman of Variety writing that "Chazelle orchestrates a dashingly original mood of adventure drenched in anxiety".

Chazelle directed the first two episodes of the May 2020-released Netflix musical drama television miniseries The Eddy. The series is written by Jack Thorne, with Grammy-winning songwriter Glen Ballard and Alan Poul attached as executive producers. The series is set in Paris and consists of eight episodes.

In July 2019, Variety reported that his next film, called Babylon, set in 1920s Hollywood, was scheduled to be released in 2021, co-produced by his wife, Olivia Hamilton. Chazelle was eyeing Emma Stone to star; Brad Pitt has also been rumored to have a role. In December 2020, it was reported that Margot Robbie was in talks to replace Stone. The Hollywood Reporter reported that Babylon would have a limited release on December 25, 2022, before expanding into wide release on January 6, 2023. The film's final cast included Margot Robbie, Pitt, Li Jun Li, Jovan Adepo and Jean Smart. The film was a box office bomb receiving only $4.5 million opening weekend. Many industry experts predict the film will need to make $250 million just to break even against its $80 million budget and marketing costs. The film received polarizing reviews. Manhola Dargis of The New York Times wrote, "Throughout this disappointing movie, what’s missing is the one thing that defined the silent era at its greatest and to which Chazelle remains bafflingly oblivious: its art." At the same time, Wall Street Journal film critic Kyle Smith called the movie "one of the year's most ambitious and impressive works."

Upcoming projects 
In 2018 it was reported that Apple TV+ had given the director a direct-to-series order for an untitled drama series to be made for the streaming service, but no other information has been released yet. In December 2022, Chazelle and Hamilton signed a first-look deal with Paramount Pictures.

Personal life 
Chazelle married producer Jasmine McGlade in 2010; they divorced in 2014. In October 2017, Chazelle and actress Olivia Hamilton, a Princeton University graduate and former McKinsey & Company consultant, announced their engagement, and the couple married September 22, 2018. They have a son who was born in November 2019.

Chazelle is fluent in French.

Filmography 
Film

Short film

Television

Accolades 

Directed Academy Award performances

Chazelle has directed multiple Oscar-winning and nominated performances.

See also 
 List of oldest and youngest Academy Award winners and nominees – Youngest winners for Best Director

References

External links 

 

1985 births
Living people
English-language film directors
American film directors
American male screenwriters
Harvard University alumni
Writers from Providence, Rhode Island
American people of English descent
American people of French descent
Best Screenplay Golden Globe winners
Best Director Golden Globe winners
American people of Canadian descent
Best Director BAFTA Award winners
Best Directing Academy Award winners
Screenwriters from Rhode Island
People from Princeton, New Jersey
Princeton High School (New Jersey) alumni
Screenwriters from New Jersey